Les Autels-Saint-Bazile is a former commune in the Calvados department in the Normandy region of north-western France. On 1 January 2016, it was merged into the new commune of Livarot-Pays-d'Auge.

Geography
Les Autels-Saint-Bazile is located some 45 km south-east of Caen and 28 km south-west of Lisieux. The eastern and southern border of the commune is the departmental border between Calvados and Orne. Access to the commune is by the D38 road from Heurtevent in the north which forms part of the northern border before crossing the commune and passing through the village continuing to the south. The D155 comes from the north and passes down the north-eastern side of the commune before continuing south to Le Renouard. The D38A goes east from the village to connect with the D155. The D111 also passes south through the western extension of the commune. The commune is mixed forest and farmland.

The Monne river forms the eastern border of the commune as it flows north-east to join the Vie north of La Brévière. An unnamed stream rises in the centre of the commune and flows east to join the Monne. The Aubette forms the western border  of the western extension of the commune. The Ruisseau de Clermont rises in the west of the commune and flows north to join the Aubette.

Administration

List of Successive Mayors

Demography
In 2017 the delegated commune had 50 inhabitants.

Culture and heritage

Religious heritage

The Parish Church of Saint Basile contains two items that are registered as historical objects:
A Consecrated water bowl with water-sprinkler (17th century)
A Statue: Virgin and child (15th century)

See also
Communes of the Calvados department

References

External links
Les Authels and St. Bazile on the 1750 Cassini Map

Former communes of Calvados (department)
Populated places disestablished in 2016